The Noblex is a German made, motor-driven swing-lens panoramic camera manufactured by Kamera-Werkstätten. There are several models of this camera for  different film formats. 

Cameras with similar functions include the Widelux and Horizon.

References

External links 

 Official site (German)

German cameras
Panoramic cameras